Left Right and Centre is a 1959 British satirical comedy film directed by Sidney Gilliat and starring Ian Carmichael, Patricia Bredin, Richard Wattis, Eric Barker and Alastair Sim. It was produced by Frank Launder. A political comedy, it follows the events of a by-election in a small English town.

Plot
Robert Wilcot, a popular television personality, is selected as the Conservative candidate for the provincial town of Earndale in the upcoming by-election. His selection is mostly due to the influence of his uncle, Lord Wilcot, a powerful local figure. His opponent is to be Stella Stoker, a fishmonger's daughter with a degree from the London School of Economics who has been chosen to stand for the Labour Party.

Travelling up on the train to Earndale, the two candidates meet and while she quickly works out who he is, he remains ignorant of her true identity. To try to show off he begins to tell her about his selection for the seat and how he expects to win. He describes his opponent as a bluestocking. He also inadvertently reveals embarrassing details to her such as the fact that he has scarcely been to Earndale in his life and that his family once controlled the seat as a rotten borough. Once they arrive at Earndale station, he is soon made aware of his mistake. The electoral agents of both candidates are furious to discover they have been fraternising on the train.

Wilcot goes to visit his uncle, and finds him to be an eccentric who has turned his country house into a money-making operation for visiting coach parties of tourists. It appears that he has engineered Robert Wilcot's selection as a candidate in order to spark public interest in the election, boosting his own business. It is also clear that the political contest is added to by the enmity of the two electoral agents the Tory Christopher Harding-Pratt and Labour's Bert Glimmer.

Once on the stump the two candidates keep running into each other around Earndale, at one point during a factory visit leading to a shouting match. Both begin to become entranced by the other, and become convinced they are falling in love. This comes to a head during the hustings at Wilcot Hall where they are caught kissing in the maze by their respective agents. Burying the hatchet, the two agents try to foil the potential romance. Despite repeated attempts to break up the candidates they continue a covert relationship.

Cast and Production

Main cast
 Ian Carmichael - Robert Wilcot
 Patricia Bredin - Stella Stoker
 Richard Wattis - Harding-Pratt
 Eric Barker - Bert Glimmer
 Alastair Sim - Lord Wilcot
 Moyra Fraser - Annabel
 Jack Hedley - Bill Hemmingway
 Gordon Harker - Hardy
 William Kendall - Pottle
 Anthony Sharp - Peterson
 George Benson - Egerton
 Leslie Dwyer - Alf Stoker
 Moultrie Kelsall - Grimsby Armfield
 Jeremy Hawk - TV interviewer
 Russell Waters - Mr. Bray
 Olwen Brookes - Mrs. Samson
 John Salew - Mayor
 Bill Shine - Basingstoke
 Erik Chitty - Deputy returning officer
 Redmond Phillips - Mr. Smithson
 Irene Handl - Mrs. Maggs
 John Sharp - Mr. Reeves

Supporting cast
 Douglas Ives - Plumber
 Olaf Pooley - TV newscaster
 Hattie Jacques - Woman in car
 Frederick Leister - Himself
 Frank Atkinson - Railway Porter
 Eamonn Andrews - Himself
 Gilbert Harding - Himself
 Carole Carr - Herself
 Josephine Douglas - Herself

Cameo/Uncredited cast
 Fred Griffiths - Billingsgate Porter
 Victor Harrington - Man at Wilcot Priory
 Philip Latham - Reporter
 Jim O'Brady - Billingsgate Porter

Production
The factory scene was in fact Shepperton Studios, with many of the studio buildings, including its larger sound stages, forming the factory backdrop.

Reception
According to Kinematograph Weekly the film performed "better than average" at the British box office in 1959.

References

External links
 
 NY Times Film Review

1959 films
1959 romantic comedy films
1950s satirical films
British black-and-white films
British romantic comedy films
British Lion Films films
British satirical films
Films about elections
Films directed by Sidney Gilliat
Films scored by Humphrey Searle
Films set in England
Films set in London
1950s English-language films
1950s British films